Geoffrey Colin Harcourt  (27 June 1931 – 7 December 2021) was an Australian academic economist and leading member of the post-Keynesian school. He studied at the University of Melbourne and then at King's College, Cambridge.

Biography
After studying economics at the University of Melbourne he moved to the University of Cambridge, where he received his doctorate. In 1958, he moved to the University of Adelaide as a lecturer and was appointed to a chair in Economics at Adelaide in 1967. (He was a University Lecturer at Cambridge and a Fellow of Trinity Hall 1964–66, on leave without pay from Adelaide). He was a University Lecturer (1982–90) and Reader (1990–98) in the Faculty of Economics at Cambridge and a Fellow and College Lecturer in Economics, Jesus College, Cambridge, 1982–98, and was President of Jesus College Cambridge, 1988–89 and 1990–92.

Harcourt made major contributions to the understanding of the ideas of Keynes, Joan Robinson and other Cambridge economists. He also made important contributions in his own right to post-Keynesian and post-Kaleckian theory. A review article of one of his volumes of 'Selected Essays' argues that (i) insofar as he has written on capital theory, it has been as an innovator and not as a mere raconteur, and (ii) that he has developed his own suite of post-Keynesian models – this is evident, for example, in his 1965 paper "A two-sector model of the distribution of income and the level of employment in the short-run" which is reprinted in The Social Science Imperialists: Selected Essays of G.C. Harcourt (edited by Prue Kerr).

He was married to Joan Harcourt and they had four children: Wendy Harcourt, a full professor at the International Institute of Social Studies of Erasmus University Rotterdam (married to Claudio Sardoni, honorary professor at La Sapienza University of Rome, with two children, Caterina Sardoni and Emma Claire Sardoni); Robert Harcourt, a marine ecology professor at Macquarie University; Tim Harcourt, also an economist (married to Jo Bosben); and Rebecca Harcourt, program manager for Indigenous business education at the University of New South Wales.

Harcourt died on 7 December 2021, at the age of 90.

Honours

Selected publications 
 Parker, Robert Henry, and Geoffrey Colin Harcourt, eds. Readings in the Concept and Measurement of Income. Cambridge: Cambridge University Press, 1969.
 Laing, N. F. Capital and Growth; Selected Readings; Edited by GC Harcourt and NF Laing. [Harmondsworth, Eng.]: Penguin Books, 1971.
 Harcourt, Geoffrey Colin. Some Cambridge controversies in the theory of capital. CUP Archive, 1972.
 The Social Science Imperialists.  Selected Essays. Edited by Prue Kerr, (London: Routledge and Kegan Paul, 1982). Reprinted in the Routledge Library Editions Series in 2003.
 On Political Economists and Modern Political Economy.  Selected Essays of G.C. Harcourt. Edited by Claudio Sardoni.  (London: Routledge, 1992).  Reprinted in the Routledge Library Editions Series in 2003.
 Post-Keynesian Essays in Biography: Portraits of Twentieth Century Political Economists. (Basingstoke, Hants: Macmillan, 1993).
 Capitalism, Socialism and Post-Keynesianism.  Selected Essays of G.C. Harcourt. (Cheltenham, Glos., Edward Elgar, 1995).
 Selected Essays on Economic Policy. (London: Palgrave, 2001).
 50 Years a Keynesian and Other Essays. (London: Palgrave, 2001). 
 The Structure of Post-Keynesian Economics. The Core Contributions of the Pioneers. Cambridge: Cambridge University Press, 2006. 
 (With Prue Kerr) Joan Robinson. Houndmills, Basingstoke, Hampshire: Palgrave Macmillan, 2009.
 (with Peter Kriesler, eds) The Oxford Handbook of Post-Keynesian Economics. Volume 1: Theory and Origins. New York, Oxford University Press, 2013. Volume 2: Critiques and Methodology.
 (with Joseph Halevi, Peter Kriesler and JW Nevile) Post-Keynesian Essays from Down Under: Theory and Policy from an Historical Perspective. Four Volumes. Palgrave Macmillan, 2015.

Book chapters

Articles, a selection  
 Harcourt, Geoffrey Colin. "Some Cambridge controversies in the theory of capital." Journal of Economic Literature 7.2 (1969): 369–405.
 Harcourt, Geoffrey C., and Peter Kenyon. "Pricing and the investment decision." Kyklos 29.3 (1976): 449–477.
 Hamouda, Omar F., and Geoffrey Colin Harcourt. "Post Keynesianism: From Criticism to Coherence?." Bulletin of Economic Research 40.1 (1988): 1-33.c
 Cohen, Avi J., and Geoffrey C. Harcourt. "Retrospectives: Whatever happened to the Cambridge capital theory controversies?." Journal of Economic Perspectives (2003): 199–214.

Further reading 
 P. Arestis, G. Palma and M. Sawyer, 'Introduction' in P. Arestis (et al.), Capital Controversy, Post Keynesian Economics and the History of Economic Thought: Essays in Honour of Geoff Harcourt vol 1, Routledge, London, 1997.
 Geoffrey C Harcourt page at the New School's history of economic thought website 
 Citation for the award of an Honorary Degree at the University of Melbourne 
 His 'profile' at the Academy of the Social Sciences in Australia may be found here

References

External links
 A lengthy Interview by Alan Macfarlane with Geoff Harcourt (where he talks about his life, the Cambridge controversies and other aspects of economic theory) may be found at The University of Cambridge.

1931 births
2021 deaths
Australian economists
Companions of the Order of Australia
Fellows of Jesus College, Cambridge
People from Melbourne
Post-Keynesian economists
Academic staff of the University of Adelaide